Nosferatu: A Symphony of Horror (German: Nosferatu – Eine Symphonie des Grauens) is a 1922 silent German Expressionist horror film directed by F. W. Murnau and starring Max Schreck as Count Orlok, a vampire who preys on the wife (Greta Schröder) of his estate agent (Gustav von Wangenheim) and brings the plague to their town.

Nosferatu was produced by Prana Film and is an unauthorized and unofficial adaptation of Bram Stoker's 1897 novel Dracula. Various names and other details were changed from the novel, including Count Dracula being renamed Count Orlok. Although these changes are often represented as a defense against copyright infringement, the original German intertitles acknowledged Dracula as the source. Film historian David Kalat states in his commentary track that since the film was "a low-budget film made by Germans for German audiences...setting it in Germany with German-named characters makes the story more tangible and immediate for German-speaking viewers".

Even with several details altered, Stoker's heirs sued over the adaptation, and a court ruling ordered all copies of the film to be destroyed. However, several prints of Nosferatu survived, and the film came to be regarded as an influential masterpiece of cinema and the horror genre.

Plot

In 1838, in the fictional German town of Wisborg, Thomas Hutter is sent to Transylvania by his employer, estate agent Herr Knock, to visit a new client named Count Orlok who plans to buy a house across from Hutter's own home. While embarking on his journey, Hutter stops at an inn where the locals become frightened by the mere mention of Orlok's name.

Hutter rides on a coach to a castle, where he is welcomed by Count Orlok. When Hutter is eating dinner and accidentally cuts his thumb, Orlok tries to suck the blood out, but his repulsed guest pulls his hand away. Hutter wakes up the morning after to find fresh punctures on his neck, which he attributes to mosquitoes. That night, Orlok signs the documents to purchase the house and notices a photo of Hutter's wife, Ellen, remarking that she has a "lovely neck." Reading a book about vampires that he took from the local inn, Hutter starts to suspect that Orlok is a vampire. He cowers in his room as midnight approaches, with no way to bar the door. The door opens by itself and Orlok enters, and Hutter hides under the bed covers and falls unconscious. Meanwhile, his wife awakens from her sleep, and in a trance walks onto her balcony's railing, which gets his friend Harding's attention. When the doctor arrives, she shouts Hutter's name, apparently able to see Orlok in his castle threatening her unconscious husband.

The next day, Hutter explores the castle, only to retreat back into his room after he finds the coffin in which Orlok is resting dormant in the crypt. Hours later, Orlok piles up coffins on a coach and climbs into the last one before the coach departs, and Hutter rushes home after learning this. The coffins are taken aboard a schooner, where the sailors discover rats in the coffins. All of the ship's crew later die and Orlok takes control. When the ship arrives in Wisborg, Orlok leaves unobserved, carrying one of his coffins, and moves into the house he purchased.

Many deaths in the town follow after Orlok's arrival, which the town's doctors blame on an unspecified plague caused by the rats from the ship. Ellen reads the book Hutter found, which claims that a vampire can be defeated if a pure-hearted woman distracts the vampire with her beauty. She opens her window to invite Orlok in, but faints. Hutter revives her, and she sends him to fetch Professor Bulwer, a physician. After he leaves, Orlok enters and drinks her blood, but starts as the sun rises, causing Orlok to vanish in a puff of smoke by the sunlight. Ellen lives just long enough to be embraced by her grief-stricken husband.

The last scene shows Count Orlok's destroyed castle in the Carpathian Mountains, symbolizing the end of his bloody reign of terror.

Cast

 Max Schreck as Count Orlok
 Gustav von Wangenheim as Thomas Hutter
 Greta Schröder as Ellen Hutter
 Alexander Granach as Knock
 Georg H. Schnell as Shipowner Harding
 Ruth Landshoff as Ruth
 John Gottowt as Professor Bulwer
 Gustav Botz as Professor Sievers
 Max Nemetz as The Captain of The Empusa
 Wolfgang Heinz as First Mate of The Empusa
  as Mental Hospital Doctor
  as Sailor Two
 Guido Herzfeld as Innkeeper
 Karl Etlinger as Student with Bulwer
 Fanny Schreck as Hospital Nurse

Themes
Nosferatu has been noted for its themes regarding fear of the Other, as well as for possible anti-Semitic undertones, both of which may have been partially derived from the Bram Stoker novel Dracula, upon which the film was based. The physical appearance of Count Orlok, with his hooked nose, long claw-like fingernails, and large bald head, has been compared to stereotypical caricatures of Jewish people from the time in which Nosferatu was produced. His features have also been compared to those of a rat or a mouse, the former of which Jews were often equated with. Orlok's interest in acquiring property in the German town of Wisborg, a shift in locale from the Stoker novel's London, has also been analyzed as preying on the fears and anxieties of the German public at the time. Professor Tony Magistrale opined that the film's depiction of an "invasion of the German homeland by an outside force [...] poses disquieting parallels to the anti-Semitic atmosphere festering in Northern Europe in 1922."

When the foreign Orlok arrives in Wisborg by ship, he brings with him a swarm of rats which, in a deviation from the source novel, spread the plague throughout the town. This plot element further associates Orlok with rodents and the idea of the "Jew as disease-causing agent". Writer Kevin Jackson has noted that director F. W. Murnau "was friendly with and protective of a number of Jewish men and women" throughout his life, including Jewish actor Alexander Granach, who plays Knock in Nosferatu. Additionally, Magistrale wrote that Murnau, being a homosexual, would have been "presumably more sensitive to the persecution of a subgroup inside the larger German society". As such, it has been said that perceived associations between Orlok and anti-Semitic stereotypes are unlikely to have been conscious decisions on the part of Murnau.

Production

The studio behind Nosferatu, Prana Film, was a short-lived silent-era German film studio founded in 1921 by Enrico Dieckmann and occultist artist Albin Grau, named for the Hindu concept of prana. Although the studio's intent was to produce occult- and supernatural-themed films, Nosferatu was its only production, as it declared bankruptcy shortly after the film's release.

Grau claimed he was inspired to shoot a vampire film by a war experience: in Grau's apocryphal tale, during the winter of 1916, a Serbian farmer told him that his father was a vampire and one of the undead.

Diekmann and Grau gave Henrik Galeen, a disciple of Hanns Heinz Ewers, the task to write a screenplay inspired by the Dracula novel, although Prana Film had not obtained the film rights. Galeen was an experienced specialist in dark romanticism; he had already worked on The Student of Prague (1913), and the screenplay for The Golem: How He Came into the World (1920). Galeen set the story in the fictional north German harbour town of Wisborg. He changed the characters' names and added the idea of the vampire bringing the plague to Wisborg via rats on the ship, and left out the Van Helsing vampire hunter character. Galeen's Expressionist style screenplay was poetically rhythmic, without being so dismembered as other books influenced by literary Expressionism, such as those by Carl Mayer. Lotte Eisner described Galeen's screenplay as "" ("full of poetry, full of rhythm").

Filming began in July 1921, with exterior shots in Wismar. A take from Marienkirche's tower over Wismar marketplace with the Wasserkunst Wismar served as the establishing shot for the Wisborg scene. Other locations were the Wassertor, the Heiligen-Geist-Kirche yard and the harbour. In Lübeck, the abandoned Salzspeicher served as Nosferatu's new Wisborg house, the one of the churchyard of the Aegidienkirche served as Hutter's, and down the Depenau a procession of coffin bearers bore coffins of supposed plague victims. Many scenes of Lübeck appear in the hunt for Knock, who ordered Hutter in the Yard of Füchting to meet Count Orlok. Further exterior shots followed in Lauenburg, Rostock and on Sylt. The team filmed interior shots at the JOFA studio in Berlin's Johannisthal locality and further exteriors in the Tegel Forest.

For cost reasons, cameraman Fritz Arno Wagner only had one camera available, and therefore there was only one original negative. The director followed Galeen's screenplay carefully, following handwritten instructions on camera positioning, lighting, and related matters. Nevertheless, Murnau completely rewrote 12 pages of the script, as Galeen's text was missing from the director's working script. This concerned the last scene of the film, in which Ellen sacrifices herself and the vampire dies in the first rays of the sun. Murnau prepared carefully; there were sketches that were to correspond exactly to each filmed scene, and he used a metronome to control the pace of the acting.

Music
The original score was composed by Hans Erdmann and performed by an orchestra at the film's Berlin premiere. However, most of the score has been lost, and what remains is only a partial adapted suite. Thus, throughout the history of Nosferatu screenings, many composers and musicians have written or improvised their own soundtrack to accompany the film. For example, James Bernard, composer of the soundtracks of many Hammer horror films in the late 1950s and 1960s, wrote a score for a reissue. Bernard's score was released in 1997 by Silva Screen Records. A version of Erdmann's original score reconstructed by musicologists and composers Gillian Anderson and James Kessler was released in 1995 by BMG Classics, with several missing sequences composed anew, in an attempt to match Erdmann's style. An earlier reconstruction by German composer Berndt Heller has many additions of unrelated classical works. In 2022, the New York Times wrote about Dutch composer Jozef van Wissem's new score and record release for Nosferatu. Beginning with a solo played on the lute, his performance incorporates electric guitar and distorted recordings of extinct birds, graduating from subtlety to gothic horror. “My soundtrack goes from silence to noise over the course of 90 minutes,” he said, culminating in “dense, slow death metal.”

Deviations from the novel
The story of Nosferatu is similar to that of Dracula and retains the core characters: Jonathan and Mina Harker, Count Dracula, and so on. It omits many of the secondary players, however, such as Arthur and Quincey, and changes the names of those who remain. The setting has been transferred from Britain in the 1890s to Germany in 1838.

In contrast to Count Dracula, Orlok does not create other vampires, but kills his victims, causing the townsfolk to blame the plague which ravages the city. Orlok also must sleep by day, as sunlight would kill him, while the original Dracula is only weakened by sunlight. The ending is also substantially different from the Dracula novel; the count is ultimately destroyed at sunrise when the Mina analogue sacrifices herself to him. The town called "Wisborg" in the film is in fact a mix of Wismar and Lübeck; in other versions of the film, the name of the city is changed, for unknown reasons, back to "Bremen".

Release
Shortly before the premiere, an advertisement campaign was placed in issue #21 of the magazine , with a summary, scene and work photographs, production reports, and essays, including a treatment on vampirism by Albin Grau. Nosferatu opened in the Netherlands on 16 February 1922 at the Hague Flora and Olympia cinemas. Nosferatu premiered in Germany on 4 March 1922 in the Marmorsaal of the Berlin Zoological Garden. This was planned as a large society evening entitled  (Festival of Nosferatu), and guests were asked to arrive dressed in Biedermeier costume. The German cinema premiere itself took place on 15 March 1922 at Berlin's .

The 1930s sound version Die zwölfte Stunde – Eine Nacht des Grauens (The Twelfth Hour: A Night of Horror), which is less commonly known, was a completely unauthorized and re-edited version of the film. It was released in Vienna, Austria on 16 May 1930 with sound-on-disc accompaniment and a recomposition of Hans Erdmann's original score by Georg Fiebiger, a German production manager and composer of film music. It had an alternative ending lighter than the original and the characters were renamed again; Count Orlok's name was changed to Prince Wolkoff, Knock became Karsten, Hutter and Ellen became Kundberg and Margitta, and Annie was changed to Maria. This version, of which Murnau was unaware, contained many scenes filmed by Murnau but not previously released. The name of director F. W. Murnau is no longer mentioned in the credits. This version, lasting approximately 80 minutes, was presented on 5 June 1981 at the Cinémathèque Française.

Reception and legacy
Nosferatu brought Murnau into the public eye, especially when his film Der brennende Acker (The Burning Soil) was released a few days later. The press reported extensively on Nosferatu and its premiere. With the laudatory votes, there was also occasional criticism that the technical perfection and clarity of the images did not fit the horror theme. The Filmkurier of 6 March 1922 said that the vampire appeared too corporeal and brightly lit to appear genuinely scary. Hans Wollenberg described the film in photo-Stage No. 11 of 11 March 1922 as a "sensation" and praised Murnau's nature shots as "mood-creating elements." In the Vossische Zeitung of 7 March 1922, Nosferatu was praised for its visual style.

Nosferatu was also the first film to show a vampire dying from exposure to sunlight. Previous vampire novels such as Dracula had shown them being uncomfortable with sunlight, but not undeath-threateningly so.

The film has received overwhelmingly positive reviews. On review aggregator website Rotten Tomatoes, the film holds an approval rating of 97% based on 63 reviews, with an average rating of 9.05/10. The website's critical consensus reads, "One of the silent era's most influential masterpieces, Nosferatus eerie, gothic feel—and a chilling performance from Max Schreck as the vampire—set the template for the horror films that followed." In 1995, the Vatican included Nosferatu on a list of 45 important films that people should watch. It was ranked twenty-first in Empire magazine's "The 100 Best Films of World Cinema" in 2010.

In 1997, critic Roger Ebert added Nosferatu to his list of The Great Movies, writing:

 The 2000 film Shadow of the Vampire is a fictionalized take on the making of Nosferatu.

Home video and copyright status
Nosferatu only entered the public domain worldwide at the end of 2019. This led to the widespread distribution of a sped-up, unrestored black and white bootleg copy. Beginning in 1981, the film has had various different official restorations, several of which have been issued on home video in the U.S., Europe and Australia. These versions, which are all tinted, speed-corrected and have specially recorded scores, are separately copyrighted with respect to new copyrightable elements.

Remakes
A 1979 remake by director Werner Herzog, Nosferatu the Vampyre, starred Klaus Kinski (as Count Dracula, not Count Orlok).

A remake by director David Lee Fisher was in development after being successfully funded on Kickstarter on 3 December 2014. On 13 April 2016, it was reported that Doug Jones had been cast as Count Orlok in the film and that filming had begun. The film would use green screen to insert colorized backgrounds from the original film atop live-action, a process Fisher previously used for his remake The Cabinet of Dr. Caligari (2005). As of 2023, this version remains unreleased, with the last update coming from Jones in 2020.

In July 2015, another remake was announced with Robert Eggers writing and directing. The film was intended to be produced by Jay Van Hoy and Lars Knudsen for Studio 8. In November 2016, Eggers expressed surprise that the Nosferatu remake was going to be his second film, saying "It feels ugly and blasphemous and egomaniacal and disgusting for a filmmaker in my place to do Nosferatu next. I was really planning on waiting a while, but that's how fate shook out." In 2017, it was announced that Anya Taylor-Joy would be featured in the film in an unknown role. However, in a 2019 interview, Eggers claimed that he was unsure as to whether the film would still be made, saying "...But also, I don't know, maybe Nosferatu doesn't need to be made again, even though I've spent so much time on that." It was reported in September 2022 that Eggers' remake would be distributed by Focus Features, with Bill Skarsgård set to star as Orlok and Lily-Rose Depp.

In popular culture
 The song "Nosferatu" from the album Spectres (1977) by American rock band Blue Öyster Cult is directly about the film.
 The 1979 album Nosferatu by Hugh Cornwell and Robert Williams is an homage to the film, featuring a still from the movie on the front cover and a dedication to Max Schreck.
 The television miniseries adaptation of Stephen King's Salem's Lot (1979) took inspiration from Nosferatu for the appearance of its villain, Kurt Barlow (Reggie Nalder). The film's producer Richard Kobritz stated that: "We went back to the old German Nosferatu concept where he is the essence of evil, and not anything romantic or smarmy, or, you know, the rouge-cheeked, widow-peaked Dracula."
 The music video for Queen and David Bowie’s 1981 single "Under Pressure" incorporates footage from Nosferatu.
 In the Commodore 64 version of the video game Uninvited, when the player reaches the hallway, the narrated text compares the painting to the film Nosferatu.
 French progressive rock outfit Art Zoyd released Nosferatu (1989) on Mantra Records. Thierry Zaboitzeff and Gérard Hourbette composed the cues to correspond with an edited and unrestored version of the film.
 In the Japanese manga series Berserk, a legendary fighter named Zodd earns the title “Nosferatu” due to his supposed immortality. However, the character does not share any of the vampiric traits of Count Orlok.
 A 1993 episode of the children's anthology series Are You Afraid of the Dark? titled "The Tale of the Midnight Madness" is about a Nosferatu movie where the vampire can leave the film and enter the real world.
 Bernard J. Taylor adapted the story into the 1995 musical Nosferatu the Vampire. The title character is called Nosferatu, and the plot of the musical follows the plot of Murnau's film, yet other characters’ names are reverted to names from the novel (Mina, Van Helsing, etc.).
 Count Orlok has made multiple appearances in SpongeBob SquarePants, most notably In the final seconds of the episode "Graveyard Shift", where Count Orlok, erroneously referred to by the cast as Nosferatu, is revealed as the one responsible for flickering the lights.
 The 2000 film Shadow of the Vampire, directed by E. Elias Merhige and written by Steven A. Katz, is a fictionalized account of the making of Nosferatu in which Max Schreck is portrayed as an actual vampire whom F.W. Murnau allows to kill his actors and crew on film in order to create a sense of "realism". It stars Willem Dafoe as Schreck and John Malkovich as Murnau. The film was nominated for two Academy Awards at the 73rd Academy Awards.
 An operatic version of Nosferatu was composed by Alva Henderson in 2004, with libretto by Dana Gioia, was released on CD in 2005, with Douglas Nagel as Count Orlok/Nosferatu, Susan Gundunas as Ellen Hutter (Mina Harker), Robert McPherson as Eric Hutter (Thomas Hutter/Jonathan Harker) and Dennis Rupp as Skuller (Knock/Renfield).
 On 28 October 2012, as part of the BBC Radio "Gothic Imagination" series, the film was reimagined on BBC Radio 3 as the radio play Midnight Cry of the Deathbird by Amanda Dalton directed by Susan Roberts, with Malcolm Raeburn playing the role of Graf Orlok (Count Dracula), Sophie Woolley as Ellen Hutter, Henry Devas as Thomas Hutter and Terence Mann as Knock.
 In the 2015 film Me and Earl and the Dying Girl, the protagonists make a number of home movies with one titled 'Nose Ferret 2', an homage to Nosferatu.
 Orlok makes an appearance as an incidental antagonist in Jonathan Green's ACE gamebook Dracula: Curse of the Vampire.
 The 2018 album Thunderbolt by Saxon contains the song "Nosferatu (The Vampire's Waltz)" based on the film.
 The 2022 Doctor Who spin-off straight-to-DVD P.R.O.B.E. Case Files: Vol 2 featured short film Living Fiction, using footage of and tributing Nosferatu, previously released as a video download on BBV Productions website in 2021.
 The 2022 album We Are the Apocalypse by Swedish black metal band Dark Funeral contains the song Nosferatu which is a nod to the film.

See also

 List of German films of 1919–1932
 Gothic film
 Vampire film

References

Bibliography
  (1921-1922 reports and reviews)

External links

 
 
 
 
 Nosferatu: History and Home Video Guide at Brenton Film
 

1922 films
1922 horror films
Articles containing video clips
Dracula films
German black-and-white films
German Expressionist films
German horror films
German silent feature films
German vampire films
Gothic horror films
Films adapted into operas
Films directed by F. W. Murnau
Films based on horror novels
Films of the Weimar Republic
Films involved in plagiarism controversies
Films set in 1838
Films set in castles
Films set in Europe
Films set in Germany
Films set in Transylvania
Films set on ships
Films shot at Johannisthal Studios
Films shot in Slovakia
 
Unofficial film adaptations
Silent adventure films
Silent horror films
1920s German films
1920s German-language films